Henry Bogacki (November 8, 1912 April 3, 2007) was a center for New York Yankees and Rochester Tigers.

References 

Rochester Tigers players
New York Yankees (1936 AFL) players
Canisius Golden Griffins football players
1912 births
2007 deaths
American football centers